MV Magnum is a cargo ship in service with Magnum Shipping of Belize City, Belize. It was built in 1979 and initially in service with a Russian shipping company and was, until 2009, known as Znamya Oktyabra (meaning The White Banner). It is configured to carry wood or wood products, and is based in Phnom Penh, Cambodia. Its callsign is XUNA3.

References
 Russian Maritime Register of Shipping

Cargo ships of Russia
Merchant ships of Cambodia
1979 ships